Nebria tatrica komareki is a subspecies of ground beetle in the Nebriinae subfamily that can be found in Czech Republic and Slovakia.

References

tatrica komareki
Beetles described in 1992
Beetles of Europe